Lyndon Center is an unincorporated village and census-designated place (CDP) in the town of Lyndon, Caledonia County, Vermont, United States. The community is located along the western border of Lyndonville. Lyndon Center has a post office with ZIP code 05850. The community was first listed as a CDP prior to the 2020 census.

References

Census-designated places in Caledonia County, Vermont
Census-designated places in Vermont
Unincorporated communities in Caledonia County, Vermont
Unincorporated communities in Vermont